"Waiting for You" is a song by New Zealand singer and songwriter Sharon O'Neill. The song was released in June 1981 as the lead single from her forthcoming third studio album, Maybe (1981). O'Neill performed the song live on the Countdown on 2 August 1981. The song peaked at number 50 in Australia.

Track listing 
7" (BA 222811)
Side A "Waiting for You" – 3:28
Side B "Love Can Be Cruel" – 3:25

Charts

References 

1981 songs
1981 singles
Sharon O'Neill songs
Songs written by Sharon O'Neill